David Meade may refer to:
 David Meade (author), American end-times conspiracy theorist and book author
 David Meade (politician) (born 1976), American Republican party politician
 David C. Meade (1940–2019), U.S. Army major general